Gracia Yancey Backer (born January 25, 1950) is an American politician who served in the Missouri House of Representatives from 1983 to 2001. She graduated from William Woods College.

References

1950 births
Living people
Democratic Party members of the Missouri House of Representatives
Women state legislators in Missouri